is a former Japanese football player. He played for Japan national team.

Club career
Taninaka was born in Fuchu on September 24, 1964. After graduating from high school, he joined Japan Soccer League club Fujita Industries in 1983. He moved to Regional Leagues club PJM Futures (later Tosu Futures) in 1991. He retired in 1995.

National team career
On September 30, 1984, when Taninaka was 20 years old, he debuted for Japan national team against South Korea. He played 3 games for Japan until 1986.

Club statistics

National team statistics

References

External links

Japan National Football Team Database

1964 births
Living people
Association football people from Tokyo
Japanese footballers
Japan international footballers
Japan Soccer League players
Japan Football League (1992–1998) players
Shonan Bellmare players
Sagan Tosu players
Association football forwards